Raber Township is a township in Hughes County, in the U.S. state of South Dakota. Its population was 26 as of the 2010 census.

References

Townships in South Dakota
Townships in Hughes County, South Dakota
Pierre, South Dakota micropolitan area